William Clough (13 May 1862 – 11 May 1937) was a British Liberal Party politician.

Background
A son of Thomas and Hannah Clough, he was educated at Steeton Provident School, Keighley Trade School and Pannal College, Harrogate. He married in 1886, Louisa Clapham of Browfield, Keighley. They had one son and one daughter.

Career
He was Liberal MP for Skipton, Yorkshire from 1906 to 1918. He first stood for parliament at the 1906 General election, when he held Skipton. He was re-elected at both 1910 General Elections. He stepped down from parliament at the age of 56, at the 1918 General Election and did not stand again. He represented the Oakworth Division on the West Riding County Council.

External links 
Who Was Who; http://www.ukwhoswho.com
Portrait of Clough; National Portrait Gallery

Sources
Who Was Who
British parliamentary election results 1885–1918, Craig, F. W. S.

References

1862 births
1937 deaths
Liberal Party (UK) MPs for English constituencies
UK MPs 1906–1910
UK MPs 1910
UK MPs 1910–1918